The Citizens Building is a historic building in Downtown Columbus, Ohio. It was listed on the Columbus Register of Historic Properties in 2013, and was listed as part of the High and Gay Streets Historic District, on the National Register of Historic Places, in 2014.

The building was built in 1917 for the Citizens Trust and Savings Company. It currently houses the Citizens, 63 apartment units managed by Drucker & Falk. It also houses Veritas, one of Columbus's fine dining restaurants, as well as a cocktail bar, The Citizens Trust, run by the same owners. The building also houses the flagship location of Brioso Coffee, which relocated there in 2019.

See also
 National Register of Historic Places listings in Columbus, Ohio

References

External links
 

Commercial buildings completed in 1917
Columbus Register properties
Buildings in downtown Columbus, Ohio
National Register of Historic Places in Columbus, Ohio
Historic district contributing properties in Columbus, Ohio
High Street (Columbus, Ohio)